South Mountain is a mountain in Greene County, New York and partially in Schoharie County, New York. It is located in the Catskill Mountains southwest of West Durham. Ashland Pinnacle is located west-southwest, and Steenburg Mountain is located north of South Mountain.

References

Mountains of Greene County, New York
Mountains of New York (state)
Mountains of Schoharie County, New York